Jayasuriya or Jayasooriya is a Sinhalese name. It derives from Sanskrit and consists of two parts: Jaya, which means victory in Sinhalese and is also the name of a Hindu demigod, and suriya (sun). The name may refer to the following notable people:

Surname
A. P. Jayasuriya (1901–1980), Sri Lankan politician
Asanga Jayasooriya (born 1971), Sri Lankan cricketer
Bernard Jayasuriya, Sri Lankan businessman and politician
Chandrasena Jayasuriya (born 1935), Sri Lankan boxer
Chathurangi Jayasooriya (born 1990), Sri Lankan netball player
Clodagh Jayasuriya, Sri Lankan politician
D. P. Jayasuriya (born 1882), Sri Lankan politician
Gamini Jayasuriya (1924–1998), Sri Lankan politician
Hempala Jayasuriya (born 1930), Sri Lankan boxer
Jagath Jayasuriya, Sri Lankan Army general
Jayantha Jayasuriya, Sri Lankan lawyer
Justin Jayasuriya, Sri Lankan Navy rear admiral
Karu Jayasuriya (born 1940), Sri Lankan politician
Kasun Jayasuriya (born 1980), Sri Lankan soccer player
Lucian Jayasuriya, Sri Lankan physician and medical manager
Mervyn Jayasuriya (died 2008), Sri Lankan radio journalist
Prabath Jayasuriya (born 1991), Sri Lankan cricketer
Sanath Jayasuriya (born 1969), Sri Lankan cricketer
Shehan Jayasuriya (born 1991), Sri Lankan cricketer
Siritunga Jayasuriya, Sri Lankan trade unionist and politician
Sisira Jayasuriya, Australian professor of economics

Given name
Jayasurya (born 1978), Indian film producer
Jayasoorya Abhiram (born 1959), Indian cricketer

See also

Jaya Suriya Engineering College, Chennai, India

References

Sinhalese surnames